Shagged Married Annoyed (or Sh**ged Married Annoyed) is a British comedy podcast hosted by married couple Chris Ramsey and Rosie Ramsey. In the podcast the couple discuss "life, relationships, arguments, annoyances, parenting, growing up and everything in between." The first episode was released on iTunes and Spotify on 15 February 2019. By May 2020, the podcast had reached 25 million downloads worldwide. As of April 2022, it has had more than 100 million downloads. The show was announced as one of the most popular podcasts in the UK in 2020 in Spotify's annual Wrapped feature.

Chris and Rosie Ramsey published the book Sh**ged. Married. Annoyed. in September 2020 following the success of the podcast. It became a Sunday Times Bestseller. They announced that they would be going on tour with the podcast in 2020, but the initial run was postponed to 2021 due to the COVID-19 pandemic. A second leg of the tour has since been announced for autumn 2023.

Format and production 
The podcast format features free-flowing discussion between Chris and Rosie, along with regular segments including answering questions from the public and sharing 'beefs' they have with each other. The episodes are recorded in the couple's home kitchen. Each episode begins with a theme tune recorded by the couple called "We had a fight about the jingle".

Recurring Segments 

 What's Your Beef?
 Rosie's Mysteries
 Questions from the Public
 Celebrity Questions

Production Changes 
On 26 March 2020, podcast company Acast announced that Shagged Married Annoyed had joined the Acast Creator Network, bringing it alongside other British comedy podcasts including Off Menu with Ed Gamble and James Acaster and My Dad Wrote a Porno. Shagged Married Annoyed is produced by Avalon and is released weekly on Fridays.

Reception 
Shagged Married Annoyed has regularly made it to the top of the Apple Podcasts charts. As of November 2021, it has received over 39,000 ratings with an average of 4.9 out of 5 stars.

Awards 
Shagged Married Annoyed won Best Podcast at the 2020 Global Awards. It won the Listeners' Choice Award at the British Podcast Awards 2020 with a record total of 229,000 public votes, along with a bronze award for Best New Podcast. It also won a bronze award for Funniest Show at the 2020 ARIAS. On 21 April 2021, Shagged Married Annoyed was announced as a nominee for Best Independent Podcast in the 2021 ARIAS.

In March 2022, it won the Best Comedy Podcast in the National Comedy Awards 2021. The podcast won the award again at the 2023 National Comedy Awards in February 2023.

Critical reception 
Hannah J Davies of The Guardian described the podcast as a "comforting, craic-filled show" that "is not to be underestimated". The Radio Times included Shagged Married Annoyed in their 'Best podcasts to listen to in 2021' describing it as "excellent light-hearted listening." In a review for The Times, James Marriott gave the podcast two out of five stars, calling it "cringey with effortful banter".

Book 
In January 2020, Chris and Rosie Ramsey announced that they would be writing a book based on their podcast. Sh**ged. Married. Annoyed. was published by Penguin imprint Michael Joseph on 3 September 2020 who described it as "relatable guide that explores the highs and lows of dating, relationships, marriage and everything in between." The book became a Sunday Times No.1 bestseller in the first week of its release.

Tour 
In February 2020, Chris and Rosie Ramsey announced that they would be taking the podcast on a live tour in eight venues across the UK during September that year. They also said that they would aim to break the record for the biggest live podcast audience at their show in the Utilita Arena, Newcastle. They broke the record within 60 minutes of tickets going on sale, including 9,028 tickets at Utilita Arena and over 19,000 sales for the tour in total. Due to popular demand, new dates were added to the tour on 6 March 2020.

In July 2020, it was announced that the tour would be postponed until 2021 due to the COVID-19 pandemic. Due to increased demand, in April 2021 the couple announced that they were adding over 110,000 extra tickets to their tour across nine additional venues, including the O2 Arena, London.

The live show features the regular podcast segment 'What's your beef?', a discussion with fictional characters Barry and Belinda Beef, and a segment where Chris and Rosie read stories from the audience.

In a review for the Evening Standard, Bruce Dessau described the show as "an evening of crowdpleasing, undemanding, relatable laughs." Brian Logan of The Guardian praised Chris and Rosie's charms as hosts and called the show a "mildly amusing night out".

Episodes

References

External links 
 https://www.shaggedmarriedannoyed.com/

British podcasts
Comedy and humor podcasts
Audio podcasts
2019 podcast debuts